Coscinodiscus is a genus of diatoms in the family Coscinodiscaceae. It is the type genus of its family.

References

External links 
 
 
 Coscinodiscus at the World Register of Marine Species (WoRMS)

Coscinodiscophyceae genera
Taxa named by Christian Gottfried Ehrenberg